Ish-Shalom ("Man of Peace") may refer to:

 Meir Ish-Shalom (Friedman) (1831 - 1908), Hungarian rabbi
 Mordechai Ish-Shalom (1902 - 1991), an Israeli politician
 Benjamin Ish-Shalom (born 1953), an Israeli professor of Jewish Studies

See also 
 Judaism and peace

Hebrew-language surnames